IVX-411 is a COVID-19 candidate nanoparticle vaccine under development by Icosavax currently undergoing a Phase I/II clinical trial in Australia. It was originally developed at the Institute of Protein Design (IPD) and the University of Washington School of Medicine, both based at the University of Washington.

References 

Clinical trials
American COVID-19 vaccines
Australian COVID-19 vaccines
Science and technology in the United States
Virus-like particle vaccines